Stuart Jones (born 7 December 1981) is an English professional rugby league footballer who has played in the 2000s and 2010s. He has played for Castleford Tigers (Heritage No. 896). He has previously played for Huddersfield Giants, St Helens (Heritage No. 1123) and Wigan Warriors (Heritage No. 949). Stuart was awarded a 2-year contract extension by Castleford in June 2009 tying him to the club until the end of the 2011 season.

Jones has represented England on one occasion in the 98–4 victory over Russia in 2004 where he scored a try.
Jones played for Huddersfield in the 2006 Challenge Cup Final from the interchange bench against St Helens but the Giants lost 12–42.

References

External links
Saints Heritage Society profile
 England Match Report  "Russia 4-98 England", BBC Online , Sunday, 24 October 2004. 

1981 births
Living people
Castleford Tigers players
England national rugby league team players
English rugby league players
Huddersfield Giants players
Rugby league locks
Rugby league players from Wigan
Rugby league second-rows
St Helens R.F.C. players
Wigan Warriors players